ZNL-FM is an adult contemporary station serving Nassau and New Providence, with a sales office in Freeport.  Before becoming Love FM, It was formerly named Pink 97 Radio.

External links 
 ZNL-FM Love 97 FM's Facebook Page
 ZNL-FM Love 97 FM's Twitter Page

Radio stations in the Bahamas
Adult contemporary radio stations
Radio stations established in 2004